The Argo is the ship captained by Jason in Greek mythology.

Argo may also refer to:

Places

United States 
 Argo, Alabama, a town
 Argo, Georgia, a ghost town
 Argo, Illinois, a subdivision of Summit
 Argo, Iowa, a census-designated place
 Argo, Kentucky, an unincorporated community
 Argo, Missouri, an unincorporated community
 Argo, Nebraska, a ghost town

Elsewhere 
 Argo (crater), on Mars
 Argo, Saskatchewan, Canada, an unincorporated community or siding
 Argo District, Badakhshan Province, Afghanistan
 Argo Glacier, Miller Range, Antarctica
 Argo Island, Nile River, Sudan
 Argo Point, a headland in Graham Land, Antarctica
 Lake Harku or Argo, Estonia
 Name for Argos, Greece, in (Curiate) Italian, also as Latin Catholic (now titular) diocese

People 
 Argo (name), a list of people with the surname or given name
 Argo, a ring name of German professional wrestler Achim Albrecht
 Argo, a football player for the Toronto Argonauts of the Canadian Football League

Arts and entertainment 
 Argo (Liberman), a 1974 abstract sculpture by Alexander Liberman

Fictional entities 
 Argo, a spaceship in the TV series Star Blazers
 Argo, a shuttlecraft/all-terrain vehicle on the USS Enterprise (NCC-1701-E)
 Argo, a character in the series Sword Art Online
 Argo City, a city on Krypton in DC Comics
 Argo the Almighty, a character who appeared in the Marvel Comics' MC2 series A-Next
 Argo, one of the dogs in the myth of Actaeon

Films 
 Argo (2006 film), a short film by Jordan Bayne
 Argo (2012 film), a feature film directed by and starring Ben Affleck, about a fictional film of the same name used for a CIA cover story

Music 
 Argo (band), a Greek band
 Argo Records (UK), a defunct British record label
 Argo Records, a defunct subsidiary of Chess Records, based in the United States
 Argo (film score), the film score of the 2012 film starring Ben Affleck.

Brands and enterprises 
 Argo, a brand of corn starch owned by Associated British Foods
 Argo Hotel, Crofton, Nebraska, on the US National Register of Historic Places
 Argo Investments Ltd, an Australian Listed Investment Company
 Argo Medical, developer of the ReWalk walking device
 ARGO SpA, Italian company that manufactures or distributes agricultural equipment
 Argo Tea, Chicago-based tea shop
 Benelli Argo, a rifle

Computing 
 Argo (web browser), a web browser developed in 1994 by Bert Bos
 Argo, a computer game by Kure Software Koubou
 Zune or Argo, a Microsoft digital media store
 Argo (video game), a 2017 video game developed by Bohemia Interactive

Transport

Air and space 
 Argo (NASA spacecraft), a proposed spacecraft mission
  Argo (Russian spacecraft), a proposed Russian spacecraft planned to be launched in 2024.
 Alliance A-1 Argo, an American two-seat biplane of the late 1920s
 ArGo Airways, a Greek regional airline
 Direct Fly ArGO, a Czech microlight aircraft design

Terrain 
 Argo (automobile), a defunct American automobile company
 Argo (1863–1892), one of the eight South Devon Railway Dido class steam locomotives
 Argo AI, an autonomous car development company affiliated with Ford Motor Company and Volkswagen Group
 Argo Bromo Anggrek, an Indonesian executive class train travelling from Jakarta to Surabaya
 Argo Electric, an electric vehicle built from 1912 to 1916 in Saginaw, Michigan
 Argo Jati, an Indonesian semi-executive class train travelling from Jakarta to Cirebon
 Argo Racing Cars, a British constructor of racing cars
 Fiat Argo, a subcompact car produced by Fiat

Water 
 , any one of at least four civilian surface vessels of that name
 Argo (ROV), an unmanned submersible used by Robert Ballard to discover the wreck of RMS Titanic
 Argo-class submarine, operated by the Italian Regia Marina (Royal Navy) in World War II
, a submarine of the Italian Argo class
, a submarine which served in the French Navy from 1933 to 1946
 , five ships of the Royal Navy
 Italian ship Argo (MEN209), a 1971 presidential yacht of the Italian Navy
 , a US Coast Guard patrol boat
 USS Snatch (ARS-27) or M/V Argo, a research vessel

Other transport 
 Argo (ATV manufacturer), an amphibious ATV/UTV manufactured in New Hamburg, Canada
 Argo D-4, a rocket

Other uses 
 Argo (oceanography), an oceanographic project
 Argo Community High School, Summit, Illinois
 RC Argo, a rugby club in Kyiv, Ukraine
 Task Force Argo, an American volunteer group which has evacuated people from Afghanistan since 2021
 L'Argo, a newspaper published in Malta in 1804
 Argo Dam, a dam in Ann Arbor, Michigan, United States
 Argo Gold Mine and Mill, a former gold mine in Idaho Springs, Colorado, United States
 Argo Tunnel, a mine drainage and access tunnel in Idaho Springs, Colorado

See also 
 
 Argos (disambiguation)
 ArgoUML, an open source designing application
 Argus (disambiguation)